Odontomachus is a genus of ants commonly called trap-jaw ants found in the tropics and subtropics throughout the world.

Overview

Commonly known as trap-jaw ants, species in Odontomachus have a pair of large, straight mandibles capable of opening 180°. These jaws are locked in place by an internal mechanism, and can snap shut on prey or objects when sensory hairs on the inside of the mandibles are touched.  The mandibles are powerful and fast, giving the ant its common name. The mandibles either kill or maim the prey, allowing the ant to bring it back to the nest. Odontomachus ants can simply lock and snap their jaws again if one bite is not enough, or to cut off bits of larger food. The mandibles also permit slow and fine movements for other tasks such as nest building and care of larvae. The ants were also observed to use their jaws as a catapult to eject intruders or fling themselves backwards to escape a threat.

The larvae of trap-jaw ants are remarkable in being ornamented with long spikes and presenting dorsal adhesive pads for fixation onto internal ant nest walls. They are carnivorous, extremely active larvae. Apparently, they undergo three larval moults before entering metamorphosis. Their larvae use substrate to spin cocoons.

Diet 
Trap-jaw ants are mostly carnivorous, but will also consume nectar, insect honeydew and ripe fruit.

Speed record
Trap-jaw ants of this genus have the second-fastest moving predatory appendages within the animal kingdom, after the dracula ant (Mystrium camillae). The peak force exerted was in the order of 300 times the body weight of the ant, and acceleration of 1,000,000 m/s² or 100,000 g.

Mimicry
The jumping spider genus Enoplomischus seems to mimic this ant genus.

Distribution
Odontomachus species are found in Central and South America, Asia, Australia, and Africa.

In the United States, O. haematodus was "recorded in Alabama back in 1956, but now researchers have officially confirmed that the species has spread across the Gulf Coast, at least as far east as Pensacola, Florida." In the past, O. ruginodis was thought to be confined to the Orlando region, but Magdalena Sorger, a PhD candidate at North Carolina State University, has confirmed a record of O. ruginodis more than 100 miles north of Orlando, in Gainesville, Florida. Odontomachus relictus, however, is only found in "endangered scrub habitat on central Florida’s ancient sand ridges."

Species

73 valid species
 Odontomachus aciculatus F. Smith, 1863
 Odontomachus affinis Guerin-Meneville, 1844
Odontomachus alius Sorger & Zettel, 2011
Odontomachus allolabis Kempf, 1974
Odontomachus angulatus Mayr, 1866
Odontomachus animosus Smith, 1860
Odontomachus assiniensis Emery, 1892
Odontomachus banksi Forel, 1910
Odontomachus bauri Emery, 1892
Odontomachus biolleyi Forel, 1908
Odontomachus biumbonatus Brown, 1976
Odontomachus bradleyi Brown, 1976
Odontomachus brunneus (Patton, 1894)
Odontomachus caelatus Brown, 1976
Odontomachus cephalotes Smith, 1863 (Indonesia, Australia, etc.)
Odontomachus chelifer (Latreille, 1802)
Odontomachus circulus Wang, 1993
Odontomachus clarus Roger, 1861
Odontomachus coquereli Roger, 1861
Odontomachus cornutus Stitz, 1933
Odontomachus desertorum Wheeler, 1915
Odontomachus erythrocephalus Emery, 1890
Odontomachus floresensis Brown, 1976 (Indonesia: Flores)
Odontomachus fulgidus Wang, 1993
Odontomachus granatus Wang, 1993
Odontomachus haematodus (Linnaeus, 1758) (South America, introduced to Australia prior to 1876); type species
Odontomachus hastatus (Fabricius, 1804)
Odontomachus imperator Emery, 1887
Odontomachus infandus Smith, 1858
Odontomachus insularis Guérin-Méneville, 1844
Odontomachus kuroiwae (Matsumura, 1912)
Odontomachus laticeps Roger, 1861
Odontomachus latidens Mayr, 1867
Odontomachus latissimus Viehmeyer, 1914
Odontomachus malignus Smith, 1859
Odontomachus mayi Mann, 1912
Odontomachus meinerti Forel, 1905
Odontomachus minangkabau Satria, Kurushima, Herwina, Yamane & Eguchi, 2015 
Odontomachus montanus Stitz, 1925
Odontomachus monticola Emery, 1892
Odontomachus mormo Brown, 1976
Odontomachus nigriceps Smith, 1860
Odontomachus opaciventris Forel, 1899
Odontomachus opaculus Viehmeyer, 1912
†Odontomachus paleomyagra Wappler, Dlussky, Engel, Prokop & Knor, 2014
Odontomachus panamensis Forel, 1899
Odontomachus papuanus Emery, 1887
Odontomachus pararixosus Terayama & Ito, 2014
Odontomachus peruanus Stitz, 1933
Odontomachus philippinus Emery, 1893
Odontomachus procerus Emery, 1893 
†Odontomachus pseudobauri (De Andrade, 1994)
Odontomachus relictus Deyrup & Cover, 2004
Odontomachus rixosus Smith, 1857
Odontomachus ruficeps Smith, 1858 (Australia)
Odontomachus rufithorax Emery, 1911
Odontomachus ruginodis Smith, 1937
Odontomachus saevissimus Smith, 1858
Odontomachus scalptus Brown, 1978
Odontomachus schoedli Sorger & Zettel, 2011
Odontomachus scifictus Sorger & Zettel, 2011
Odontomachus silvestrii W.M. Wheeler, 1927
Odontomachus simillimus F. Smith, 1858 (Australia, Fiji, etc.)
†Odontomachus spinifer De Andrade, 1994
Odontomachus spissus Kempf, 1962
Odontomachus sumbensis Brown, 1976
Odontomachus tensus Wang, 1993
Odontomachus testaceus Emery, 1897
Odontomachus troglodytes Santschi, 1914 (Africa, Madagascar, Inner Seychelles)
 Odontomachus turneri Forel, 1900 (Australia)
Odontomachus tyrannicus Smith, 1859
Odontomachus xizangensis Wang, 1993
Odontomachus yucatecus Brown, 1976

References

External links

 Mississippi Entomology Museum: Pictures of worker and male O. haematodus
 Ant's super-fast bite is a built-in 'ejector seat'
 Ferocious ants bite like a bullet - BBC News, 21 August 2006. Elli Leadbeater. Retrieved 22 August 2006
 Man-trap jaws make ant fastest predator - Scotsman, 22 August 2006. John Von Radowitz. Retrieved 22 August 2006

Ponerinae
Ant genera